Martino Antonio Tomacelli (died 1519) was a Roman Catholic prelate who served as Bishop of Cassano all'Jonio (1491–1519).

Biography
On 31 Jan 1491, Martino Antonio Tomacelli was appointed during the papacy of Pope Innocent VIII as Bishop of Cassano all'Jonio. He served as Bishop of Cassano all'Jonio until his death in 1519.

References

External links and additional sources
 (for Chronology of Bishops) 
 (for Chronology of Bishops)  

15th-century Italian Roman Catholic bishops
16th-century Italian Roman Catholic bishops
Bishops appointed by Pope Innocent VIII
1519 deaths